NGC 88 is a barred spiral galaxy exhibiting an inner ring structure located about 160 million light years from the Earth in the Phoenix constellation. NGC 88 is interacting with the galaxies NGC 92, NGC 87 and NGC 89.
It is part of a family of galaxies called Robert's Quartet discovered by astronomer John Herschel in the 1830s.

References

NGC 88

External links
 
 

Phoenix (constellation)
0088
01370
Robert's Quartet
Barred spiral galaxies
18340930